County Leitrim was a Parliamentary constituency in Ireland, represented in the House of Commons of the United Kingdom of Great Britain and Ireland. It returned two MPs from 1801 to 1885 and one from 1918 to 1922.

Boundaries
This constituency comprised the whole of County Leitrim.

Members of Parliament

MPs 1801–85

MPs 1918–22

Elections

Elections in the 1830s

 

 

 

Clements' death caused a by-election.

Elections in the 1840s

Elections in the 1850s

  
 

 

  
 

 

Montgomery resigned by accepting the office of Steward of the Manor of Hempholme, causing a by-election.

Elections in the 1860s

Elections in the 1870s

 

 

 

Gore succeeded to the peerage, becoming Lord Harlech, and causing a by-election.

Elections in the 1880s

Elections in the 1910s

Notes

References
The Parliaments of England by Henry Stooks Smith (1st edition published in three volumes 1844–50), 2nd edition edited (in one volume) by F.W.S. Craig (Political Reference Publications 1973)

Westminster constituencies in County Leitrim (historic)
Dáil constituencies in the Republic of Ireland (historic)
Constituencies of the Parliament of the United Kingdom established in 1801
Constituencies of the Parliament of the United Kingdom disestablished in 1885
Constituencies of the Parliament of the United Kingdom established in 1918
Constituencies of the Parliament of the United Kingdom disestablished in 1922